Parkhomivka is a village in Bohodukhiv Raion, Kharkiv Oblast, Ukraine. It belongs to Krasnokutsk settlement hromada, one of the hromadas of Ukraine.  The village has a population of 3,679.

Until 18 July 2020, Parkhomivka belonged to Krasnokutsk Raion. The raion was abolished in July 2020 as part of the administrative reform of Ukraine, which reduced the number of raions of Kharkiv Oblast to seven. The area of Krasnokutsk Raion was merged into Bohodukhiv Raion.

References

External links
 Parkhomivka at the Verkhovna Rada of Ukraine site

Villages in Bohodukhiv Raion
Bogodukhovsky Uyezd